Jan-Philipp Kalla (born 6 August 1986) is a German former professional footballer who plays as a defender for SC Victoria Hamburg. He spent his entire professional career with FC St. Pauli.

Career
Kalla made his debut on the professional league level in the 2. Bundesliga for FC St. Pauli on 6 May 2008 when he started in a game against 1. FC Kaiserslautern.

His contract with FC St. Pauli was not extended at the end of the 2019–20 season. He spent 17 years at the club making 164 league appearances.

Post-playing career
Kalla took up a representative role at FC St. Pauli in August 2020. He also joined fifth-tier side SC Victoria Hamburg.

Career statistics

References

External links
 

1986 births
Living people
German footballers
Footballers from Hamburg
Association football defenders
Bundesliga players
2. Bundesliga players
Hamburger SV players
FC St. Pauli players
SC Victoria Hamburg players
21st-century German people